South Lancashire Tramways was a system of electric tramways in south Lancashire authorised by the South Lancashire Tramways Act of 1900. The system was the largest standard-gauge electric tramway outside London.

The company had difficulty raising capital and at the end of November 1900 its shares were acquired by the South Lancashire Electric Traction and Power Company. It also acquired the shares of the Lancashire Light Railways Company and the South Lancashire Electric Supply Company. Construction began in late 1901 and in October 1902 the first section from Lowton through Leigh and Atherton to Four Lane Ends at Over Hulton opened.

Atherton became the centre of the system and the tram sheds, power station and offices were built on the north side of Leigh Road at Howe Bridge (grid reference ).  

Unrestored tram body, No 65 built by Brush Electrical Engineering Company in 1906, is in the collection of the Museum of Transport, Greater Manchester.

References
Notes

Bibliography

External links
Photograph of unrestored tram 65
 Old photographs

Tram transport in England
Historic transport in Lancashire
History of Greater Manchester
Tram transport in Greater Manchester